The Changling Rinpoche are a Tibetan Buddhist lineage, founded by the Tibetan Rechungpa who lived in the eleventh century. Rechungpa himself was a student of Milarepa.

Schools of Tibetan Buddhism